Kim Dae-gon (Korean: 김대곤; born December 13, 1983) is a South Korean actor. He is known for his roles in dramas such as Touch Your Heart, My Country: The New Age and Hi Bye, Mama!.

Personal life 
On June 30, 2022, the agency confirmed that Kim will marry his non-celebrity girlfriend in October 2022.

Filmography

Film

Television series

Music video appearances

Theater

References

External links 
 
 

1983 births
Living people
21st-century South Korean male actors
South Korean male television actors
South Korean male film actors